GNU lightning is a free-software library for generating assembly language code at run-time. Version 2.1.3, released in September 2019, supports backends for SPARC (32-bit), x86 (32- and 64-bit), MIPS, ARM (32- and 64-bit), ia64, HPPA, PowerPC (32-bit), Alpha, S390 and RISC-V (64-bit).

Advantages over other libraries 
The features GNU lightning provides make it useful for Just-in-Time Compilation. In comparison to libraries such as LLVM or libJIT, GNU lightning provides only a low-level interface for assembling from a standardized RISC assembly language—loosely based on the SPARC and MIPS architectures—into the target architecture's machine language.

Disadvantages 
It does not provide register allocation, data-flow or control-flow analysis, or optimization.
Starting from 2.x, It generates code via intermediate graph, rather than one by one from each It's standardized instruction. This change allows inter-instruction optimization such as register allocation and dead code elimination .

Instruction set 
GNU lightning's instruction set is based loosely on existing RISC architectures.

Types 
When required instructions handle data with these 9 types:

Projects that use GNU lightning 
GNU Smalltalk, GNU Guile, and CLISP make use of GNU lightning for just-in-time compilation.  GNU lightning was first developed as a tool to be used in GNU Smalltalk's dynamic translator from bytecodes to native code. GNU Guile 2.9.2 and later stop using GNU lightning 2.x instead their own fork based on GNU lightning 1.4 for native code generation, because GNU lightning 2.x devotes more complexity to inter-instruction optimization.

Notes

References

External links 
GNU lightning on Free Software Directory

lightning